Franco Negri (born 20 February 1995) is an Argentine professional footballer who plays as a left-back or left midfielder for Inter Miami.

Career
Negri joined Primera División side San Lorenzo from hometown club San Martín in 2012. On 22 August 2016, fellow Primera División team Quilmes completed the loan signing of Negri. His professional career debut arrived on 22 October as they beat Lanús 1–0 at the Estadio Centenario Ciudad de Quilmes. Twelve further appearances followed in all competitions during 2016–17, which ended in relegation for Quilmes. In September 2017, Negri left on loan again to play for Independiente Rivadavia of Primera B Nacional. He remained for the entirety of 2017–18 and featured in eighteen matches.

Independiente Rivadavia signed Negri permanently on 30 June 2018. He scored his first career goal on 2 September versus Central Córdoba. Further goals came against Gimnasia y Esgrima, Deportivo Morón, ex-club Quilmes and Platense across 2018–19 and 2019–20. In October 2020, fellow Primera Nacional team Belgrano completed the signing of Negri. He played four times for them in the shortened 2020 campaign, missing the other three games partly through suspension. On 24 February 2021, Negri joined Primera División outfit Newell's Old Boys on a free transfer.

On 10 February 2022, Negri joined Godoy Cruz.

On 11 January 2023, Negri signed a two-year deal with Major League Soccer side Inter Miami.

Career statistics
.

References

External links

1995 births
Living people
Sportspeople from Mendoza Province
Argentine people of Italian descent
Argentine footballers
Association football midfielders
Argentine Primera División players
Primera Nacional players
San Lorenzo de Almagro footballers
Quilmes Atlético Club footballers
Independiente Rivadavia footballers
Club Atlético Belgrano footballers
Newell's Old Boys footballers
Godoy Cruz Antonio Tomba footballers
Inter Miami CF players
Argentine expatriate footballers
Expatriate soccer players in the United States
Argentine expatriate sportspeople in the United States